The following is a timeline of the history of the city of Krasnodar, Russia.

Prior to 20th century

 1794 - Ekaterinodar founded "on the site of an old town called Tmutarakan."
 1801 - Police force established.
 1860
 Ekaterinodar becomes seat of the Kuban Oblast.
 Population: 9,620.
 1868 - Konstantin Ivanovich Frolov becomes mayor.
 1879 -  founded.
 1886 - Population: 39,610.
 1888 -  of Alexander III erected.
 1897
 Commemorative obelisk erected.
 Population: 65,697.
 1900 - Pushkin Krasnodar Regional Universal Scientific Library founded.

20th century

 1904 -  founded.
 1912 - Statue of Catherine II erected.
 1913 - Population: 107,360.
 1920
 City renamed "Krasnodar."
 Krasnodar Children's Theatre active.
 1924 - Kuban State University established.
 1928
 Football Club Kuban Krasnodar formed.
 Hyperboloid Tower built.
 1930 - Nevsky Cathedral demolished.
 1932-1932 - Loss of over 14% of Krasnodar's population during the Soviet famine of 1932–1933
 1933 -  founded.
 1939 - Population: 203,946.
 1942 - City occupation by German forces begins.
 1943 - City occupation by German forces ends.
 1956
 House of the Soviets built.
 Statue of Lenin erected.
 1959 - Dendrarium Kubansk Agricultural Institute established.
 1960 - Kuban Stadium opens.
 1961 - .
 1965 - Population: 385,000.
 1971 - 14 June: Bombing at a bus.
 1973 - Krasnodar reservoir constructed.
 1985 - Population: 609,000.
 1987 - Valery Alexandrovich Samoilenko becomes mayor.
 1990 - Mikhail Sergeyevich Karakaj becomes mayor.
 1991 -  founded.
 1992 -  founded.
 1994 - Nikolai Fedorovich Kryazhevskikh becomes mayor.
 1997 - Nikolai Kondratenko becomes governor of Krasnodar Krai.
 2000
 Nikolai Vasilievich Priz becomes mayor.
 City becomes part of the Southern Federal District.

21st century

 2001 - Southern Telecom headquartered in Krasnodar.
 2003
 25 August: Bombing.
  in business.
 2005 -  becomes mayor.
 2008 - Football Club Krasnodar formed.
 2010 - Population: 744,933.
 2011
 Fountain installed in Theater Square.
 Basket-Hall (arena) opens.
 2013 - Krasnodar Stadium construction begins.

See also
 Timelines of other cities in the Southern Federal District of Russia: Rostov-on-Don, Volgograd

References

This article incorporates information from the Russian Wikipedia.

Bibliography

External links

Krasnodar
Krasnodar
Years in Russia
krasnodar